Hisaharu Satoh is a Japanese international lawn bowler.

Bowls career
He won a triples silver medal at the 2015 Asia Pacific Bowls Championships in Christchurch.

Satoh represented Japan in the 2016 World Outdoor Bowls Championship in Christchurch winning a bronze medal in the triples with Kenichi Emura and Kenta Hasebe. The bronze medal was the first ever bowls medal won by the nation.

In 2020 he was selected for the 2020 World Outdoor Bowls Championship in Australia.

References 

Living people
Japanese male bowls players
Year of birth missing (living people)